WCVL may refer to:

 WCVL (AM), a radio station (1550 AM) licensed to serve Crawfordsville, Indiana, United States
 WCVL-FM, a radio station (92.7 FM) licensed to serve Charlottesville, Virginia, United States